

Telecommunications

Telephone
Telephone service throughout the country is excellent; international service is good to Southeast Asia, Middle East, Western Europe, and the US

 Main lines in use: 82,588 (2020)
 Mobile phones: 565,949 (2020)

Landing points for the SEA-ME-WE-3, SJC, AAG, Lubuan-Brunei Submarine Cable via optical telecommunications submarine cables that provides links to Asia, the Middle East, Southeast Asia, Africa, Australia, and the US; satellite earth stations - 2 Intelsat (1 Indian Ocean and 1 Pacific Ocean) (2019)

IDD Country Code: +673

Mobile Telephone
Brunei has 3 major telco namely DST, Imagine (TelBru) and Progresif which offers prepaid and postpaid plan. UNN is the Single Wholesale Network with holds all the telecommunication infrastructures in Brunei.

Internet
Internet service providers: 3 (2020), Telbru, Progresif Cellular and DSTCom
 Country code: .bn
Internet fixed subscriptions: 49,452 (2020)
Internet users:  410,800 (2019)

Broadband
Brunei's Internet service was monopolized by Telekom Brunei. ADSL speeds were ranging from 512 kbit/s to the maximum speed of 1 Mbit/s through ADSL2+ broadband. 1 Mbit/s was introduced in 2006 and was priced at BND$128 per month (Equivalent to Singapore currency). It was well known that the Brunei's broadband ranging from 512 kbit/s to 1 Mbit/s is one of the most expensive in the world. The limited market in Brunei means that new developments in the telecommunications sector is stagnant.

In 2002, Telekom Brunei was incorporated become Telekom Brunei Berhad (TelBru). In 2008, the internet were improved with dramatically with speeds ranging from 1Mbit/s to maximum speed of 5Mbit/s. Price starting from B$65 to B$105 per month respectively.

In 2012, Telekom Brunei started deploying its FTTH network capable of 100Mbit/s through a contract awarded to Huawei. They aimed to provide FTTH coverage to around 85% of the population by 2017.

In 2016 Telbru drastically reduced the price and increased the speeds of its broadband plans. Due to the fact that a significant number of people were now connected via FTTH and not via the old copper cables.

On 1 March 2018 Telbru rolled out their new 'high speed' broadband plans They also split the plans which have unlimited quota into 'unlimited plans'

In 2017 Forbes reported that Brunei had the 4th most expensive broadband service in the world

On 4 September 2019, The UNN took over all of the telecommunications infrastructure in Brunei. By doing so they aimed to provide equal infrastructure to all the isps in the country. This brought an end to a long held monopoly by Imagine Sdn Bhd (Formerly Known as Telbru) over the home broadband market with the introduction of Datastream Digital's 'Infinity' home broadband plans on 24 January 2020.

Television
Terrestrial TV Stations (Free to air)
In some areas residents may enjoy some of the Malaysian TV channels
 RTB Perdana (Formerly known as RTB 1 and RTB 5) - An 17-hour national flagship channel of Radio Television Brunei aired news and information programs, with local and sinetron Indonesia series in 1080p HDTV.
 RTB Aneka (Formerly known as RTB 2 and RTB 3 HD) - A 13-hour second channel of Radio Television Brunei airs entertainment programmes in 1080p HDTV.
 RTB Sukmaindera (Formerly known as RTB 4) - A 24-hour international satellite television channel airing all of RTB programs both locally and internationally in 1080p HDTV.

Pay TV (Satellite TV) 1 - Kristal Astro

Radio
All radio stations in the country use FM. 5 radio stations are broadcast by the state controlled Radio Television Brunei. The British Forces Broadcast Service (BFBS) broadcasts 2 other stations in the country. Reception from some Malaysia stations can be received.

References

 
Brunei
Brunei